James Burness Duncan (10 December 1930 – 1 December 2014) was a Scottish footballer who played as an outside left.

Duncan started his senior career with Celtic having been signed from Baillieston Juniors and scored on his debut against St Mirren on 1 November 1952, at age 22. He went on to make nine appearances for the Celtic Park club (contributing six appearances and one goal – an equaliser in an Old Firm derby – to the 1953–54 Scottish Division A title, the first championship since the 1930s) before being released in 1955. He also played for St Mirren (barely featuring in two seasons), Dundee United, Albion Rovers and Stranraer.

References

1930 births
2014 deaths
Celtic F.C. players
St Mirren F.C. players
Stranraer F.C. players
Scottish footballers
Scottish Junior Football Association players
Footballers from Glasgow
Association football outside forwards
Baillieston Juniors F.C. players
Dundee United F.C. players
Albion Rovers F.C. players
Scottish Football League players